The Gilgit District is one of the 14 districts of Pakistan-administered territory of Gilgit-Baltistan.  The headquarters of the district is the town of Gilgit. According to the 1998 census, the Gilgit District had a population of 243,324.  The district includes Gilgit (the capital city), the Bagrot Valley, Juglot, Danyore, Sultanabad, Naltar Peak, and the Nomal Valley. The highest peak in the district is Distaghil Sar , which is the seventh-highest peak in Pakistan and 19th highest in the world.

Administration

The Gilgit District is divided into three tehsils:

 Danyor Tehsil
 Gilgit Tehsil
 Juglot Tehsil

Education 

According to the Alif Ailaan Pakistan District Education Rankings 2015, the Gilgit District was ranked 35th out of 148 districts in terms of education. In terms of  facilities and infrastructure, the district was ranked 67th out of 148.

Geography

The Gilgit District is bounded on the north by the Nagar District, on the east by the Shigar District and the Rondu District, on the south by the Tangir District, the Diamer District, and the Astore District, and on the west by the Ghizer District.

Rivers
The main rivers in the district are:

 Astore River
 Gilgit River - enters the Gilgit District from the west, south of the Bichhar Pass (Naltar Valley) and flows west through the town of Gilgit
 Hunza River - flows further south and joins the Gilgit River northeast of the town of Gilgit
 Indus River - enters the Gilgit District from the Shigar District about six kilometers north of Jaglot, where the Gilgit River joins the Indus River and flows south along the Karakoram Highway.
 Khunjerab River - flows south along the Karakoram Highway from the Khunjerab Valley and is known as the Hunza River south of Sost

There are many tributaries of the main rivers, some of which are the Ghujerab River, the Hispar River, the Naltar River, the Shimshal River, and the Yaheen River.

Lakes
 Borit Lake
 Naltar Lake
 Nomal Lake
 Pahote Lake
 Rush Lake

Demographics 
In the 1941 census, the Gilgit District (then a tehsil) had a population of 22,495, distributed in 46 villages divided into 12 subdivisions.  Roughly 50% of the population followed Shia Islam and 49% other forms of Islam (Sunni and Ismaili). According to scholar Martin Sökefeld, the Sunni missionaries came from the south, Shia from the east and Ismaili from the north.

See also
List of districts in Gilgit-Baltistan
1988 Gilgit massacre

References

 
Districts of Gilgit-Baltistan